Lankershim Boulevard is a major north-south thoroughfare in the eastern San Fernando Valley, primarily within the City of Los Angeles, in
Los Angeles County, California.

Geography

Lankershim Boulevard begins at San Fernando Road in the Sun Valley portion of the San Fernando Valley. In addition to Sun Valley, it runs through North Hollywood and Universal City. It runs for about  before ending directly south of Ventura Boulevard. It crosses intersections with Interstate 5, State Route 134, and US Route 101. From a 5-way intersection at Victory Boulevard it runs diagonally to the southeast, creating 6-way intersections at the crossings of Burbank Boulevard and Tujunga Avenue, as well as Vineland Avenue and Camarillo Street.

Transportation
Metro Local line 224 serves Lankershim Boulevard.

It passes two Metro Rail stations, North Hollywood and Universal City/Studio City, both served by the B Line, and the former station is also served by the G Line.

History

Named for one of the area's founding families, Lankershim Boulevard is one of the oldest streets in the area surrounding what is now the neighborhood of North Hollywood. It was a major thoroughfare for the town of Toluca (which was itself renamed "Lankershim" in 1896), connecting it to Los Angeles by way of the Cahuenga Pass. In the center of Toluca, it crossed the Southern Pacific Railroad, with a depot near the current location of the North Hollywood Metro Station at Chandler Boulevard. The foundations of the original Campo de Cahuenga adobe were unearthed beneath Lankershim Boulevard during construction of the Metro Red Line subway. These parts of the foundations within the park are preserved as an exhibit, and the "footprint" of the foundations under the street and sidewalk is marked by decorative pavement.

Lankershim Boulevard around Magnolia Boulevard was the heart of the town of Lankershim and of North Hollywood and until the mid-1950s boasted the largest concentration of retail stores, banks, restaurants, and entertainment in the Valley. In 1953, for example, the shopping strip included three full-line department stores: J.C. Penney at 5261 Lankershim, Yeakel & Goss department store at 5272, and the upscale single-location Rathbun's department store at 5307–15. There were also branches of the large Harris & Frank clothing chain at 5236 Lankershim, J. J. Newberry five and dime at 5321, and Safeway at 5356. However, the nearby Valley Plaza shopping center, designed for accessibility by car with plenty of free parking, opened in 1951 and kept growing until 1956 when it claimed to be the third-largest shopping center in the country. It was difficult for the Lankershim retail district to compete and by 1980, most stores had closed including Rathbun's. Donte's, one of the West Coast's best known jazz clubs in the 1970s and 1980s was at 4269. It opened in 1966 and closed in 1988 and is now the Century West BMW auto dealer site.

CicLAvia
In 2015, Lankershim Boulevard, along with Ventura Boulevard, was the site of CicLAvia, an event sponsored by the Los Angeles County Metropolitan Transportation Authority in which major roads are temporarily closed to motorized vehicle traffic and used for recreational human-powered transport.

References

Streets in the San Fernando Valley
Streets in Los Angeles
Streets in Los Angeles County, California
Boulevards in the United States
North Hollywood, Los Angeles
Sun Valley, Los Angeles
Universal City, California
Former shopping districts and streets in Los Angeles